Hoseynabad (sometimes also spelled Hoseinabad, Hoseyn Abad or Hosein Abad) is a common name for villages in Iran. It may refer to:

Alborz Province
 Hoseynabad, Alborz, a village in Nazarabad County, Alborz Province, Iran
 Hoseynabad-e Kushk Zar, a village in Savojbolagh County, Alborz Province, Iran

Bushehr Province
 Hoseynabad, Dashtestan, a village in Dashtestan County, Bushehr Province, Iran
 Hoseynabad, alternate name of Hasanabad, Bushehr, a village in Dashtestan County, Bushehr Province, Iran
 Hoseynabad, Jam, a village in Jam County, Bushehr Province, Iran
 Hoseynabad, Riz, a village in Jam County, Bushehr Province, Iran

Chaharmahal and Bakhtiari Province
 Hoseynabad, Ardal, a village in Ardal County
 Hoseynabad, Borujen, a village in Borujen County
 Hoseynabad, Kuhrang, a village in Kuhrang County
 Hoseynabad, Lordegan, a village in Lordegan County

East Azerbaijan Province
 Hoseynabad, Heris, a village in Heris County
 Hoseynabad, Malekan, a village in Malekan County

Fars Province

Arsanjan County
 Hoseynabad, Arsanjan, a village in Arsanjan County
 Hoseynabad, Khobriz, a village in Arsanjan County
 Hoseynabad-e Katak, a village in Arsanjan County
 Hoseynabad-e Najafabad, a village in Arsanjan County

Bavanat County
 Hoseynabad, Bavanat, a village in Bavanat County
 Hoseynabad, Bagh Safa, a village in Bavanat County

Darab County
 Hoseynabad, Balesh, a village in Darab County
 Hoseynabad, Paskhan, a village in Darab County
 Hoseynabad, Rostaq, a village in Darab County
 Hoseynabad-e Jadid, Darab, a village in Darab County

Eqlid County
 Hoseynabad, Eqlid, a village in Eqlid County

Farashband County
 Hoseynabad, Farashband, a village in Farashband County

Fasa County
 Hoseynabad, Fasa, a village in Fasa County
 Hoseynabad, Kushk-e Qazi, a village in Fasa County
 Hoseynabad, Now Bandegan, a village in Fasa County
 Hoseynabad, Sheshdeh and Qarah Bulaq, a village in Fasa County
 Hoseynabad, Shibkaveh, a village in Fasa County

Firuzabad County
 Hoseynabad-e Saravi, a village in Firuzabad County
 Hoseynabad-e Sargar, a village in Firuzabad County

Gerash County
 Hoseynabad, Gerash, a village in Gerash County

Jahrom County
 Hoseynabad-e Ghebleh, a village in Jahrom County
 Hoseynabad, Jahrom, a village in Jahrom County

Kazerun County
 Hoseynabad, Chenar Shahijan, a village in Kazerun County
 Hoseynabad, Dadin, a village in Kazerun County
 Hoseynabad, Khesht, a village in Kazerun County

Kharameh County
 Hoseynabad, Kharameh, a village in Kharameh County

Khonj County
 Hoseynabad, Khonj, a village in Khonj County

Lamerd County
 Hoseynabad-e Tarman, a village in Lamerd County

Larestan County
 Hoseynabad, Larestan, a village in Larestan County
 Hoseynabad, Beyram, a village in Larestan County
 Hoseynabad-e Barkeh Puz, a village in Larestan County

Marvdasht County
 Hoseynabad, Marvdasht, a village in Marvdasht County
 Hoseynabad, Doruzdan, a village in Marvdasht County
 Hoseynabad, Kamfiruz, a village in Marvdasht County
 Hoseynabad, Ramjerd-e Do, a village in Marvdasht County
 Hoseynabad, Rudbal, a village in Marvdasht County
 Hoseynabad Kamin, a village in Marvdasht County

Neyriz County
 Hoseynabad, Abadeh Tashk, a village in Neyriz County
 Hoseynabad, Qatruyeh, a village in Neyriz County
 Hoseynabad-e Surmaq, a village in Neyriz County

Pasargad County
 Hoseynabad, Kamin, a village in Pasargad County
 Hoseynabad, Sarpaniran, a village in Pasargad County

Rostam County
 Hoseynabad, Rostam, a village in Rostam County

Sepidan County
 Hoseynabad, Sepidan, a village in Sepidan County
 Hoseynabad, Sornabad, a village in Sepidan County
 Hoseynabad-e Sarab, a village in Sepidan County

Shiraz County
 Hoseynabad, Shiraz, a village in Shiraz County
 Hoseynabad, Arzhan, a village in Shiraz County
 Hoseynabad, Zarqan, a village in Shiraz County

Gilan Province
 Hoseynabad, Amlash, a village in Amlash County
 Hoseynabad, Fuman, a village in Fuman County
 Hoseynabad, Langarud, a village in Langarud County
 Hoseynabad-e Chaf, a village in Langarud County
 Hoseynabad, Rudsar, a village in Rudsar County

Golestan Province
 Hoseynabad, Aliabad, a village in Aliabad County
 Hoseynabad, Bandar-e Gaz, a village in Bandar-e Gaz County
 Hoseynabad, Galikash, a village in Galikash County
 Hoseynabad-e Qorbani, Galikash, a village in Galikash County
 Hoseynabad-e Malek, a village in Gorgan County
 Hoseynabad-e Qorbani, Ramian, a village in Ramian County
 Hoseynabad-e Sistaniha, a village in Ramian County
 Hoseynabad-e Tappeh Sari, a village in Ramian County

Hamadan Province
 Hoseynabad, Asadabad, a village in Asadabad County
 Hoseynabad, Bahar, a village in Bahar County
 Hoseynabad-e Bahar, a village in Bahar County
 Hoseynabad-e Latka, a village in Bahar County
 Hoseynabad, Kabudarahang, a village in Kabudarahang County
 Hoseynabad-e Nazem, a village in Malayer County
 Hoseynabad-e Qosh Bolagh, a village in Malayer County
 Hoseynabad-e Shamlu, a village in Malayer County
 Hoseynabad, Nahavand, a village in Nahavand County
 Hoseynabad-e Chulak, a village in Nahavand County
 Hoseynabad Gian, a village in Nahavand County
 Hoseynabad, Khezel, a village in Nahavand County

Hormozgan Province
 Hoseynabad, Bandar Abbas, a village in Bandar Abbas County
 Hoseynabad-e Shageman, a village in Bashagard County
 Hoseynabad, Bastak, a village in Bastak County
 Hoseynabad, Hajjiabad, a village in Hajjiabad County
 Hoseynabad, alternate name of Dehestan-e Bala, a village in Hajjiabad County
 Hoseynabad, Parsian, a village in Parsian County
 Hoseynabad, Rudan, a village in Rudan County

Ilam Province
 Hoseynabad, Ilam, a village in Ilam County

Isfahan Province
 Hoseynabad, Kavirat, a village in Aran va Bidgol County
 Hoseynabad, Ardestan, a village in Ardestan County
 Hoseynabad, Zavareh, a village in Ardestan County
 Hoseynabad, Buin va Miandasht, a village in Buin va Miandasht County
 Hoseynabad, Chadegan, a village in Chadegan County
 Hoseynabad, Falavarjan, a village in Falavarjan County
 Hoseynabad, Baraan-e Shomali, a village in Isfahan County
 Hoseynabad, Qahab-e Shomali, a village in Isfahan County
 Hoseynabad, Jarqavieh Olya, a village in Isfahan County
 Hoseynabad, Jarqavieh Sofla, a village in Isfahan County
 Hoseynabad-e Qohab, a village in Isfahan County
 Hoseynabad, Kashan, a village in Kashan County
 Hoseynabad, Khur and Biabanak, a village in Khur and Biabanak County
 Hoseynabad-e Asheq, a village in Nain County
 Hoseynabad-e Hajj Kazem, a village in Nain County
 Hoseynabad, Najafabad, a village in Najafabad County
 Hoseynabad, Natanz, a village in Natanz County
 Hoseynabad, Semirom, a village in Semirom County
 Hoseynabad, Shahreza, a village in Shahreza County
 Hoseynabad, Tiran and Karvan, a village in Tiran and Karvan County
 Hoseynabad, Rezvaniyeh, a village in Tiran and Karvan County
 Hoseynabad Rural District (Isfahan Province), in Najafabad County

Kerman Province

Anar County
 Hoseynabad, Anar, a city in Anar County
 Hoseynabad Rural District (Anar County)

Anbarabad County
 Hoseynabad, Anbarabad, a village in Anbarabad County
 Hoseynabad-e Dehdar, a village in Anbarabad County
 Hoseynabad-e Harandi, a village in Anbarabad County
 Hoseynabad-e Jadid, Anbarabad, a village in Anbarabad County
 Hoseynabad-e Luli, a village in Anbarabad County
 Hoseynabad-e Mazafari, a village in Anbarabad County
 Hoseynabad-e Olya, Anbarabad, a village in Anbarabad County
 Hoseynabad-e Zinabad, a village in Anbarabad County
 Hoseynabad Rural District (Anbarabad County)

Arzuiyeh County
 Hoseynabad, Arzuiyeh, a village in Arzuiyeh County
 Hoseynabad, Vakilabad, a village in Arzuiyeh County
 Hoseynabad-e Khani, Arzuiyeh, a village in Arzuiyeh County
 Hoseynabad-e Yek, Arzuiyeh, a village in Arzuiyeh County

Baft County
 Hoseynabad, Baft, a village in Baft County

Bardsir County
 Hoseynabad-e Mahunak, a village in Bardsir County
 Hoseynabad-e Yek, Bardsir, a village in Bardsir County

Fahraj County
 Hoseynabad-e Alam Khan, a village in Fahraj County
 Hoseynabad-e Khoda Bandeh, a village in Fahraj County
 Hoseynabad-e Molla Amir, a village in Fahraj County
 Hoseynabad-e Sar Jangal, a village in Fahraj County
 Hoseynabad-e Vakil, a village in Fahraj County
 Hoseynabad-e Vali Mohammad, a village in Fahraj County

Faryab County
 Hoseynabad-e Hormeh, a village in Faryab County
 Hoseynabad-e Sargel, a village in Faryab County
 Hoseynabad-e Sargorij, a village in Faryab County

Jiroft County
 Hoseynabad, Esfandaqeh, a village in Jiroft County
 Hoseynabad, Halil, a village in Jiroft County
 Hoseynabad, Saghder, a village in Jiroft County
 Hoseynabad-e Do, Jiroft, a village in Jiroft County
 Hoseynabad-e Yek, Jiroft, a village in Jiroft County
 Hoseynabad-e Zirki, a village in Jiroft County

Kahnuj County
 Hoseynabad, Kahnuj, a village in Kahnuj County

Kerman County
 Hoseynabad-e Akhund, Kerman, a village in Kerman County
 Hoseynabad-e Do, Chatrud, a village in Kerman County
 Hoseynabad-e Ghafuri, a village in Kerman County
 Hoseynabad-e Khan, Ekhtiarabad, a village in Kerman County
 Hoseynabad-e Khan, Sar Asiab-e Farsangi, a village in Kerman County
 Hoseynabad-e Yek, Kerman, a village in Kerman County
 Hoseynabad-e Goruh Rural District, an administrative subdivision of Kerman County

Kuhbanan County
 Hoseynabad-e Yek, Kuhbanan, a village in Kuhbanan County
 Hoseynabad 4, a village in Kuhbanan County

Manujan County
 Hoseynabad, Manujan, a village in Manujan County

Narmashir County
 Hoseynabad-e Derakhti, a village in Narmashir County
 Hoseynabad-e Khan, Narmashir, a village in Narmashir County
 Hoseynabad-e Posht-e Rud, a village in Narmashir County

Qaleh Ganj County
 Hoseynabad, Qaleh Ganj, a village in Qaleh Ganj County

Rabor County

Ravar County
 Hoseynabad-e Dam Dahaneh, a village in Ravar County

Rafsanjan County
 Hoseynabad, Azadegan, a village in Rafsanjan County
 Hoseynabad, Darreh Doran, a village in Rafsanjan County
 Hoseynabad, Eslamiyeh, a village in Rafsanjan County
 Hoseynabad, Ferdows, Rafsanjan, a village in Rafsanjan County
 Hoseynabad, Koshkuiyeh, a village in Rafsanjan County
 Hoseynabad, Nuq, a village in Rafsanjan County
 Hoseynabad, Qasemabad, a village in Rafsanjan County
 Hoseynabad-e Eslami, Rafsanjan, a village in Rafsanjan County

Rigan County
 Hoseynabad-e Ab Shur, a village in Rigan County
 Hoseynabad-e Latabad, a village in Rigan County
 Hoseynabad-e Rud Shur, a village in Rigan County
 Hoseynabad-e Sarhang, a village in Rigan County

Rudbar-e Jonubi County
 Hoseynabad-e Morad Khan, a village in Rudbar-e Jonubi County
 Hoseynabad-e Yarahmadi, a village in Rudbar-e Jonubi County
 Hoseynabad-e Zeh Kalut, a village in Rudbar-e Jonubi County

Shahr-e Babak County
 Hoseynabad, Dehaj, a village in Shahr-e Babak County
 Hoseynabad, Estabraq, a village in Shahr-e Babak County
 Hoseynabad, Khatunabad, a village in Shahr-e Babak County
 Hoseynabad-e Madvar, a village in Shahr-e Babak County
 Hoseynabad-e Robat, a village in Shahr-e Babak County
 Hoseynabad-e Rumani, a village in Shahr-e Babak County

Sirjan County
 Hoseynabad, Mahmudabad-e Seyyed, a village in Sirjan County
 Hoseynabad, Pariz, a village in Sirjan County
 Hoseynabad-e Fazeli, a village in Sirjan County
 Hoseynabad-e Khani, Sirjan, a village in Sirjan County
 Hoseynabad-e Shomareh-ye Seh, a village in Sirjan County

Zarand County
 Hoseynabad, Zarand, a village in Zarand County
 Hoseynabad-e Akhund, Zarand, a village in Zarand County
 Hoseynabad-e Jadid, Zarand, a village in Zarand County
 Hoseynabad-e Jahangirkhan, a village in Zarand County
 Hoseynabad-e Rahatabad, a village in Zarand County

Kermanshah Province
 Hoseynabad, Harsin, a village in Harsin County
 Hoseynabad, Kangavar, a village in Kangavar County
 Hoseynabad, Baladarband, a village in Kermanshah County
 Hoseynabad, Kuzaran, a village in Kermanshah County
 Hoseynabad, Mahidasht, a village in Kermanshah County
 Hoseynabad-e Ruintan, a village in Kermanshah County
 Hoseynabad, Ravansar, a village in Ravansar County
 Hoseynabad, Hojr, a village in Sahneh County
 Hoseynabad, Khodabandehlu, a village in Sahneh County
 Hoseynabad-e Amjadi, a village in Sonqor County
 Hoseynabad-e Deh Boneh, a village in Sonqor County
 Hoseynabad-e Quri Chay, a village in Sonqor County

Khuzestan Province
 Hoseynabad (32°10′ N 49°21′ E), Andika, a village in Andika County
 Hoseynabad (32°14′ N 49°25′ E), Andika, a village in Andika County
 Hoseynabad, Andimeshk, a village in Andimeshk County
 Hoseynabad, Behbahan, a village in Behbahan County
 Hoseynabad-e Sheykh, a village in Behbahan County
 Hoseynabad-e Soltani, a village in Behbahan County
 Hoseynabad, Hendijan, a village in Hendijan County
 Hoseynabad, Masjed Soleyman, a village in Masjed Soleyman County
 Hoseynabad Rural District (Khuzestan Province), in Shush County

Kohgiluyeh and Boyer-Ahmad Province
 Hoseynabad-e Mokhtar, a village in Boyer-Ahmad County
 Hoseynabad-e Olya, Kohgiluyeh and Boyer-Ahmad, a village in Boyer-Ahmad County
 Hoseynabad-e Sofla, Kohgiluyeh and Boyer-Ahmad, a village in Boyer-Ahmad County
 Hoseynabad-e Rowshanabad, a village in Kohgiluyeh County

Kurdistan Province
 Hoseynabad, Bijar, a village in Bijar County
 Hoseynabad-e Demirchi, a village in Bijar County
 Hoseynabad-e Gorgan, a village in Bijar County
 Hoseynabad-e Kamarzard, a village in Bijar County
 Hoseynabad, Dehgolan, a village in Dehgolan County
 Hoseynabad, Divandarreh, a village in Divandarreh County
 Hoseynabad-e Shomali Rural District, in Divandarreh County
 Hoseynabad-e Kangareh, a village in Qorveh County
 Hoseynabad-e Zelleh Jub, a village in Qorveh County
 Hoseynabad, alternate name of Hasanabad-e Mohammad Nazar, a village in Qorveh County
 Hoseynabad, Sanandaj, a village in Sanandaj County
 Hoseynabad-e Jonubi Rural District, in Sanandaj County
 Hoseynabad, Sarvabad, a village in Sarvabad County
 Hoseynabad, Zherizhah, a village in Sarvabad County

Lorestan Province
 Hoseynabad, Delfan, a village in the Central District of Delfan County
 Hoseynabad, Kakavand, a village in Kakavand District, Delfan County
 Hoseynabad Bey Baba, a village in the Central District of Delfan County
 Hoseynabad-e Olya, Lorestan, a village in Delfan County
 Hoseynabad, Dorud, a village in the Central District of Dorud County
 Hoseynabad Shahivand, a village in Dowreh County
 Hoseynabad, Khorramabad, a village in Khorramabad County
 Hoseynabad, Rumeshkhan, a village in Rumeshkhan County
 Hoseynabad, Doab, a village in Selseleh County
 Hoseynabad, Honam, a village in Selseleh County
 Hoseynabad, alternate name of Hasanabad, Qaleh-ye Mozaffari, a village in Selseleh County
 Hoseynabad, Qaleh-ye Mozaffari, a village in Selseleh County
 Hoseynabad-e Amiri, Lorestan, a village in Selseleh County
 Hoseynabad-e Hendi Olya, a village in Selseleh County
 Hoseynabad-e Khayyat, a village in Selseleh County

Markazi Province
 Hoseynabad, Arak, a village in Arak County
 Hoseynabad, alternate name of Hasanabad, Arak, a village in Arak County
 Hoseynabad, Farahan, a village in Farahan County
 Hoseynabad, Khomeyn, a village in Khomeyn County
 Hoseynabad-e Sadat, a village in Khomeyn County
 Hoseynabad-e Muqufeh, a village in Khondab County
 Hoseynabad, Komijan, a village in Komijan County
 Hoseynabad, Saveh, a village in Saveh County
 Hoseynabad, Shazand, a village in Shazand County
 Hoseynabad, Sarband, a village in Shazand County
 Hoseynabad, Zalian, a village in Shazand County
 Hoseynabad, Zarandieh, a village in Zarandieh County

Mazandaran Province
 Hoseynabad, Harazpey-ye Jonubi, a village in Amol County
 Hoseynabad, Pain Khiyaban-e Litkuh, a village in Amol County
 Hoseynabad, Dabudasht, a village in Amol County
 Hoseynabad, Behshahr, a village in Behshahr County
 Hoseynabad-e Olya, Mazandaran, a village in Chalus County
 Hoseynabad-e Sofla, Mazandaran, a village in Chalus County
 Hoseynabad, Fereydunkenar, a village in Fereydunkenar County
 Hoseynabad, Estakhr-e Posht, a village in Neka County
 Hoseynabad, Zarem Rud, a village in Neka County
 Hoseynabad, Nur, a village in Nur County
 Hoseynabad, Sari, a village in Sari County
 Hoseynabad, Tonekabon, a village in Tonekabon County

North Khorasan Province
 Hoseynabad, North Khorasan, a village in Shirvan County, North Khorasan Province, Iran
 Hoseynabad-e Khankowr, a village in Esfarayen County, North Khorasan Province, Iran
 Hoseynabad-e Kordha, North Khorasan, a village in Esfarayen County, North Khorasan Province, Iran

Qazvin Province
 Hoseynabad, Abyek, a village in Abyek County, Qazvin Province, Iran
 Hoseynabad-e Kord, a village in Abyek County, Qazvin Province, Iran
 Hoseynabad, Buin Zahra, a village in Buin Zahra County, Qazvin Province, Iran
 Hoseynabad-e Beglar Beygi, a village in Buin Zahra County, Qazvin Province, Iran
 Hoseynabad-e Amini, a village in Buin Zahra County, Qazvin Province, Iran
 Hoseynabad-e Shah Nazar, a village in Buin Zahra County, Qazvin Province, Iran
 Hoseynabad-e Eqbal, a village in Qazvin County, Qazvin Province, Iran
 Hoseynabad, Kuhin, a village in Qazvin County, Qazvin Province, Iran
 Hoseynabad, Tarom Sofla, a village in Qazvin County, Qazvin Province, Iran
 Hoseynabad, Takestan, a village in Takestan County, Qazvin Province, Iran
 Hoseynabad-e Jarandaq, a village in Takestan County, Qazvin Province, Iran

Qom Province
 Hoseynabad, Qom
 Hoseynabad-e Mish Mast
 Hoseynabad-e Zand

Razavi Khorasan Province

Bajestan County
 Hoseynabad, Bajestan, a village in Bajestan County

Bakharz County
 Hoseynabad-e Taqi, a village in Bakharz County

Bardaskan County
 Hoseynabad, Bardaskan, a village in Bardaskan County
 Hoseynabad-e Mahlar-e Olya, a village in Bardaskan County
 Hoseynabad-e Mahlar-e Sofla, a village in Bardaskan County

Chenaran County
 Hoseynabad, Chenaran, a village in Chenaran County
 Hoseynabad, Golbajar, a village in Chenaran County
 Hoseynabad-e Madaras, a village in Chenaran County

Dargaz County
 Hoseynabad, Dargaz, a village in Dargaz County
 Hoseynabad-e Sedaqat, a village in Dargaz County

Davarzan County
 Hoseynabad, Davarzan, a village in Davarzan County

Fariman County
 Hoseynabad-e Qaleh Sorkh, a village in Fariman County
 Hoseynabad-e Rekhneh Gol, a village in Fariman County

Firuzeh County
 Hoseynabad-e Kamal al Malek, a village in Firuzeh County

Gonabad County
 Hoseynabad, Gonabad, a village in Gonabad County
 Hoseynabad (Khunabad), a village in Gonabad County

Joghatai County
 Hoseynabad, Joghatai, a village in Joghatai County

Jowayin County
 Hoseynabad-e Mirza Momen, a village in Jowayin County

Khalilabad County
 Hoseynabad, Khalilabad, a village in Khalilabad County

Khoshab County
 Hoseynabad, Khoshab, a village in Khoshab County

Khvaf County
 Hoseynabad, Khvaf, a village in Khvaf County
 Hoseynabad, Salami, a village in Khvaf County

Mashhad County
 Hoseynabad, Ahmadabad, a village in Mashhad County
 Hoseynabad, Razaviyeh, a village in Mashhad County
 Hoseynabad-e Gazband, a village in Mashhad County
 Hoseynabad-e Gusheh, a village in Mashhad County
 Hoseynabad-e Qorqi, a village in Mashhad County

Nishapur County
 Hoseynabad, Miyan Jolgeh, a village in Nishapur County
 Hoseynabad, Zeberkhan, a village in Nishapur County
 Hoseynabad-e Arab, a village in Nishapur County
 Hoseynabad-e Chaghuki, a village in Nishapur County
 Hoseynabad-e Jadid, Razavi Khorasan, a village in Nishapur County
 Hoseynabad-e Jangal, Razavi Khorasan, a village in Nishapur County
 Hoseynabad-e Makhtari, a village in Nishapur County
 Hoseynabad-e Nazer, a village in Nishapur County

Rashtkhvar County
 Hoseynabad-e Rashtkhvar, a village in Rashtkhvar County

Sabzevar County
 Hoseynabad, Beyhaq, a village in Sabzevar County
 Hoseynabad, Shamkan, a village in Sabzevar County
 Hoseynabad-e Ganji, a village in Sabzevar County

Torbat-e Heydarieh County

Torbat-e Jam County
 Hoseynabad, Torbat-e Jam, a village in Torbat-e Jam County
 Hoseynabad-e Aqa Beyk, a village in Torbat-e Jam County
 Hoseynabad-e Kalali, a village in Torbat-e Jam County

Torqabeh and Shandiz County

Zaveh County
 Hoseynabad, Zaveh, a village in Zaveh County

Semnan Province
 Hoseynabad-e Dula, a village in Damghan County
 Hoseynabad-e Hajji Ali Naqi, a village in Damghan County
 Hoseynabad-e Kordeh, a village in Garmsar County
 Hoseynabad-e Koru, a village in Garmsar County
 Hoseynabad, Kalat-e Hay-ye Sharqi, a village in Meyami County
 Hoseynabad-e Kalpu, a village in Meyami County
 Hoseynabad Pol-e Abrish, a village in Meyami County
 Hoseynabad-e Saghar, a village in Shahrud County
 Hoseynabad-e Zandeh, a village in Shahrud County

Sistan and Baluchestan Province
 Hoseynabad, Bampur, a village in Bampur County
 Hoseynabad, Dalgan, a village in Dalgan County
 Hoseynabad-e Bagh-e Nil, a village in Dalgan County
 Hoseynabad-e Gaz Shahan, a village in Dalgan County
 Hoseynabad Ladi, a village in Dalgan County
 Shahrak-e Hoseynabad, a village in Dalgan County
 Hoseynabad, Hirmand, a village in Hirmand County
 Hoseynabad, Gowhar Kuh, a village in Khash County
 Hoseynabad-e Nilgun, a village in Khash County
 Hoseynabad, alternate name of Hasanabad-e Dastgerd, a village in Khash County

South Khorasan Province

Birjand County
 Hoseynabad, Birjand, a village in Birjand County
 Hoseynabad-e Ali Mohammad, a village in Birjand County

Boshruyeh County
 Hoseynabad, Ali Jamal, a village in Boshruyeh County
 Hoseynabad, Kerend, a village in Boshruyeh County

Ferdows County
 Hoseynabad, Ferdows, a village in Ferdows County

Khusf County
 Hoseynabad, Khusf, a village in Khusf County
 Hoseynabad-e Alam, a village in Khusf County
 Hoseynabad-e Miran, a village in Khusf County
 Hoseynabad-e Sheybani, South Khorasan, a village in Khusf County

Nehbandan County
 Hoseynabad, Nehbandan, a village in Nehbandan County
 Hoseynabad (Korq-e Sang), a village in Nehbandan County
 Hoseynabad-e Abaleh, a village in Nehbandan County
 Hoseynabad-e Arabkhaneh, a village in Nehbandan County
 Hoseynabad-e Qasem, a village in Nehbandan County
 Hoseynabad-e Sar Kal, a village in Nehbandan County

Qaen County

Sarbisheh County
 Hoseynabad-e Gavahi, a village in Sarbisheh County
 Hoseynabad-e Ghinab, a village in Sarbisheh County
 Hoseynabad-e Sarzeh, a village in Sarbisheh County
 Hoseynabad-e Zeydar, a village in Sarbisheh County

Tabas County
 Hoseynabad, Tabas, a village in Tabas County

Zirkuh County
 Hoseynabad, Afin, a village in Zirkuh County
 Hoseynabad, Zirkuh, a village in Zirkuh County
 Hoseynabad, Zohan, a village in Zirkuh County
 Hoseynabad-e Pain, South Khorasan, a village in Zirkuh County

Tehran Province
 Hoseynabad, Damavand, a village in Damavand County
 Hoseynabad, Rey, a village in Rey County
 Hoseynabad-e Alizadeh, a village in Malard County 
 Hoseynabad-e Hafashlu, a village in Malard County 
 Hoseynabad-e Javaheri, a village in Varamin County
 Hoseynabad-e Kashani, a village in Varamin County
 Hoseynabad-e Qajar, a village in Pakdasht County
 Hoseynabad-e Qashqai, a village in Varamin County
 Hoseynabad-e Siahab, a village in Eslamshahr County
 Hoseynabad-e Yangejeh, a village in Robat Karim County

West Azerbaijan Province
 Hoseynabad, Bukan, a village in Bukan County
 Hoseynabad, Chaypareh, a village in Chaypareh County
 Hoseynabad, Bastam, a village in Chaypareh County
 Hoseynabad-e Marakan, a village in Khoy County
 Hoseynabad, Miandoab, a village in Miandoab County
 Hoseynabad, Mahmudabad, a village in Shahin Dezh County
 Hoseynabad, Safa Khaneh, a village in Shahin Dezh County

Yazd Province

Abarkuh County
 Hoseynabad (31°05′ N 53°20′ E), Abarkuh, a village in Abarkuh County

Ardakan County
 Hoseynabad, Ardakan, a village in Ardakan County

Bafq County
 Hoseynabad, Bafq, a village in Bafq County

Behabad County
 Hoseynabad, Asfyj, a village in Behabad County
 Hoseynabad Sar Kazeh, a village in Behabad County

Khatam County
 Hoseynabad, Khatam, a village in Khatam County
 Hoseynabad, Marvast, a village in Khatam County

Mehriz County
 Hoseynabad, Mehriz, a village in Mehriz County
 'oseynabad-e Kukok, alternate name of Kukok, a village in Mehriz County

Saduq County
 Hoseynabad, Saduq, a village in Saduq County
 Hoseynabad-e Pur Akbari, a village in Saduq County

Taft County
 Hoseynabad, Aliabad, Taft, a village in Taft County
 Hoseynabad, Sakhvid, a village in Taft County
 Hoseynabad, Shirkuh, a village in Taft County
 Hoseynabad-e Kalagushi, a village in Taft County
 Hoseynabad-e Navvab, a village in Taft County
 Hoseynabad-e Pashmi, a village in Taft County
 Hoseynabad-e Shafi Pur, a village in Taft County
 Hoseynabad-e Shurabeh, a village in Taft County

Yazd County
 Hoseynabad, Yazd, a village in Yazd County
 Hoseynabad-e Rismani, a village in Yazd County

Zanjan Province
 Hoseynabad, Abhar, a village in Abhar County
 Hoseynabad-e Qarqalu, a village in Abhar County
 Hoseynabad, Khodabandeh, a village in Khodabandeh County
 Hoseynabad, Zanjan, a village in Zanjan County
 Hoseynabad, Zanjanrud, a village in Zanjan County

See also
 Hasanabad (disambiguation)
 Hosenabad (disambiguation)
 Hussainabad (disambiguation)
 Hoseynabad-e Akhund (disambiguation)
 Hoseynabad-e Amiri (disambiguation)
 Hoseynabad-e Bala (disambiguation)
 Hoseynabad-e Do (disambiguation)
 Hoseynabad-e Jadid (disambiguation)
 Hoseynabad-e Khan (disambiguation)
 Hoseynabad-e Olya (disambiguation)
 Hoseynabad-e Pain (disambiguation)
 Hoseynabad-e Sofla (disambiguation)
 Hoseynabad-e Yek (disambiguation)
 Hoseynabad Rural District (disambiguation)
 Hüseynabad